59th Cinema Audio Society Awards
March 4, 2023

Motion Picture – Live Action:
Top Gun: Maverick

The 59th Cinema Audio Society Awards were held on March 4, 2023, at the InterContinental in Los Angeles, to honor outstanding achievements in sound mixing in film and television of 2022. The nominations were announced on January 10, 2023. The ceremony was hosted by comedian Ben Gleib.

Outgoing CAS President Karol Urban described the event as a smashing success, summarizing: "There is magic in this organization created by sound mixers for sound mixers. Mentorship, community, and kindness are critical keystones to our success. Tonight, our membership stands at just over 1,000, providing a greater diversity of experience and covering the globe in a larger international footprint than ever before. Together, we thrive through volunteerism, honoring our legends and ensuring a legacy for the future of our craft."

During the evening's festivities, CAS members and celebrity presenters also announced the Student Recognition Award. Timo Nelson from the University of Texas at Austin won the aforementioned award, receiving a check for $5,000. The other four student finalists each took home $1,000 from the CAS, along with $10,000 in products and gear to help launch their careers in sound, thanks to the support of the following generous companies: Absentia DX / Todd-AO, Acon Digital, Avid, Deity Microphones, DTS, Halter Technical, iZotope, JBL Professional by Harman, K-Tek, Krotos Audio, Lectrosonics, Inc., McDSP, ShotDeck, Sounddogs, and Sound Particles.

Winners and nominees
Winners are listed first and in bold.

Film

Television

Special awards
Filmmaker Award
 Alejandro González Iñárritu

Career Achievement Award
 Peter J. Devlin

Student Recognition Award
 Timo Nelson

References

External links

2022 film awards
2022 television awards
2022 in American cinema
Cinema Audio Society Awards